Robert Edris Davies (January 15, 1920 – April 22, 1990) was an American professional basketball player. Alongside Bobby Wanzer he formed one of the best backcourt duos in the National Basketball Association's early years. Davies and Wanzer led the Rochester Royals to the 1951 NBA championship. Davies was also a former basketball coach at the Seton Hall University and was inducted to the Naismith Memorial Basketball Hall of Fame on April 11, 1970.

Although Bob Cousy is often considered the originator of the behind-the-back dribble, Davies actually deserves the credit. His Seton Hall coach, John "Honey" Russell, once said, "He had such uncanny control of the ball behind his back that it never concerned me. He made it look as easy as the conventional dribble."

College career and military service
Davies entered Seton Hall in 1938 on a baseball scholarship, but Russell persuaded him to concentrate on basketball after seeing him practice once. Never a high scorer—his best college average was 11.8 points a game—Davies was a consummate passer and play-maker.."

Known as the "Harrisburg Houdini", Davies led Seton Hall to 43 consecutive victories from 1939 into 1941. His spectacular skills helped attract the largest crowd in basketball history at the time, 18,403 people, to Madison Square Garden in March 1941, when Seton Hall beat Rhode Island in a quarter-final game of the National Invitation Tournament.

An All-American guard in 1941 and 1942, Davies joined the U. S. Navy during World War II and led the Great Lakes Naval Training Station team to a 34–3 record before going overseas.

College statistics

Professional career
After the war, he joined the Rochester Royals and played with them through the 1954–55 season. Davies helped lead the Royals to an NBL title in 1946, and was named MVP of the NBL for the 1946–47 season.  Davies was named to the NBA All-NBA First-Team four straight years, from 1949 through 1952, and he led the NBA in assists with 321 in 1948–49.  In his 10 NBL/NBA seasons, Davis scored 7,770 points, averaging 13.7 a game, and had 2,250 assists. He added 904 points and 182 assists in 67 playoff games. He was one of the ten players named to the NBA 25th Anniversary Team in 1971.

Coaching career
Davies coached Seton Hall in 1946–47, while playing with the Royals, and compiled a 24–3 record. After retiring as a player, he coached Gettysburg College for two seasons, winning 28 games while losing 19.

Legacy
The No. 11 jersey worn by Davies during his playing days with the Rochester Royals was retired by the team. The Sacramento Kings, the present holders of the franchise, continue the honor.

After retiring from basketball, Davies was a salesman for the Converse Shoe Company.

BAA/NBA career statistics

Regular season

Playoffs

See also
List of National Basketball Association players with most assists in a game

Further reading
Bob Davies: A Basketball Legend by Barry S. Martin, Rochester Institute of Technology Press, May 2016

References

External links
 

 New York Times Obituary

1920 births
1990 deaths
All-American college men's basketball players
American men's basketball coaches
American men's basketball players
Basketball coaches from New Jersey
Basketball coaches from Pennsylvania
Basketball players from New Jersey
Basketball players from Harrisburg, Pennsylvania
Gettysburg Bullets men's basketball coaches
Guards (basketball)
Naismith Memorial Basketball Hall of Fame inductees
National Basketball Association All-Stars
National Basketball Association players with retired numbers
National Collegiate Basketball Hall of Fame inductees
Rochester Royals players
Seton Hall Pirates baseball coaches
Seton Hall Pirates men's basketball coaches
Seton Hall Pirates men's basketball players
Sportspeople from Harrisburg, Pennsylvania
United States Navy personnel of World War II